Barbara Michaela Sattler (born 1974) is a Senior Lecturer in philosophy at St Andrews University. Her area of research is metaphysics and natural philosophy in the ancient Greek world.

Career
From January to March 2017, she was an Institute of Advanced Study Fellow at St John's College, Durham.

Sattler was assistant professor at Yale University from 2007 to 2013, where she was a Fellow of the Whitney Humanities Center. She is a member of the editorial boards for The Philosophical Quarterly, Les Études platoniciennes and Archai: Journal on the origins of Western thought.

Selected publications

References

External links 
 BBC Radio 4, In Our Time link, September 2016. Barbara Sattler on the panel with Marcus du Sautoy and James Warren.

British women academics
Academics of the University of St Andrews
Living people
Yale University fellows
British scholars of ancient Greek philosophy
British women philosophers
Free University of Berlin alumni
Place of birth missing (living people)
1974 births